Silvana Konermann is a Swiss-American biochemist whose research involves CRISPR, Cas9, and their use in genome editing. She is an assistant professor of biochemistry at Stanford University, as well as the Director and co-founder of the Arc Institute in Palo Alto. 

21546 Konermann, a minor planet, was named after Konermann, in honor of her 2006 second-place finish in the Intel International Science and Engineering Fair. At that time she was a student at the Sächsisches Landesgymnasium Sankt Afra zu Meißen.

In June 2022, Konermann married Irish tech billionaire Patrick Collison, who is co-founder and CEO of Stripe, Inc., with whom she co-founded the Arc Institute. Konermann met Collison during the 2004 EU Young Scientist competition.

References

External links

Living people
Year of birth missing (living people)
Place of birth missing (living people)
Stanford University faculty
American people of Swiss descent
Biochemical engineering